Daiane Sodre (born 11 March 1993) is a Brazilian model.

Personal life 
Daiane Sodre was born in Baixa Grande, the countryside of the state of Bahia in the Northeast of Brazil. She is the youngest of 12 brothers and sisters and daughter of Julio Sodre and Analia Silva. She was baptized Daiane in honor of Diana, Princess of Wales.

Career 
Sodre began her career in 2011 after being scouted by Dilson Stein, who also worked with Alessandra Ambrosio, Carol Trentini and Gisele Bundchen. 
Soon after she signed with an NY agency. The following year she shot for Ralph Lauren and started working with Victoria's Secret.
In 2013 Sodre’s previous Mother agency, Elo Management (São Paulo, Brazil), changed her to Major Models New York which sparked a lawsuit from Marilyn NY who claimed that Sodre had broken her contract with them. The lawsuit never went to trial.
Sodre has walked in fashion shows for Giorgio Armani, Ports 1961 styled by Edward Enninful, Jeremy Scott, Oscar de la Renta and Christian Siriano amongst others and has shot with photographers like Mark Seliger, Russell James, James Macari and Dusan Reljin to name a few. Her clients include brands such as Ralph Lauren, Victoria's Secret, Maybelline, Clinique, Avon, Wella, Alo Yoga and Desigual.
Sodre is the Ambassador and spokesperson for several non-profit organizations including Larger Than Life USA, who helps seriously ill children with cancer and their families cope with their fears, treatments and social isolation, Dara Institute who works to break the cycle of hospital readmissions of critically ill children from low-income backgrounds, and Love Together Brazil, whose goal is to bring clean water to the hinterland of the northeastern Brazil by drilling artesian wells and contributing to improving the health and education of the children in the area by creating and building a sports centre.
She participated in the video "No Stylist" by French Montana feat. Drake.

References

External links
 Daiane Sodre Official Website
 Daiane Sodre on Models.com
 Daiane Sodre on fashionencyclopedia.com

Brazilian female models
Living people
1993 births